Dhimitër Jonima (? – 1409) was an Albanian nobleman from the Jonima family. Together with other Albanian noblemen he is mentioned as a participant of the Battle of Kosovo in 1389. He suffered another defeat from the Ottoman Empire shortly after the Ottoman forces captured Shkodër in 1393. Then he acted as a mediator between them and Marco Barbadigo, the husband of Helena Thopia who was at that period in possession of Krujë castle. In 1402, as an Ottoman vassal, together with other Albanian noblemen, he fought alongside Bayezid I's forces in the Battle of Ankara. After the Ottoman defeat, he accepted the suzerainty of the Venetian Republic as a vassal of Koja Zaharia. He is last mentioned in the sources in 1409 and is supposed to have died the same year. After his death, Gjon Kastrioti took possession of the Jonima dominions, which became a part of the Principality of Kastrioti. Other members of the Jonima family are mentioned in Shkodër region later, however they never reached the fame of Dhimitër Jonima. Even long after his death, in 1431, upon the defeat of Gjon Kastrioti by Ottoman forces, the lands taken from him and once belonging to Jonima family, were registered by Ottomans as the vilayet of Dhimitër Jonima.

Annotations

References

Dhimiter
14th-century Albanian people
15th-century Albanian people
1409 deaths
15th-century Venetian people
Albanian Roman Catholics
Year of birth unknown
14th-century Venetian people